Jew's mallow is a common name for several flowering plants and may refer to:

Corchorus olitorius (Arabic Mulukhiyah) in the mallow family (Malvaceae), cultivated for its edible leaves and jute fiber
Kerria japonica in the rose family (Rosaceae), cultivated as an ornamental